Qal'at Saleh District is a district of the Maysan Governorate, Iraq.

Its district centre is Qal'at Saleh, a town of an estimated 40,000 inhabitants, located on the riverbanks of the Tigris, along the road that links Basra to Amarah, a mere 40 km away. Qalat Saleh's nearest towns are the district centres of Al-Majar Al Kabeer (20 km north-west), Al Kahlaa (17 km north), and Al Azeer (29 km south).

Mandaean community
The town of Liṭlaṭa in Qal'at Saleh District was the site of a Mandaean bit manda (temple) that the British scholar E. S. Drower often visited.

References

Districts of Maysan Province